The 5th New York State Militia (after 1862 5th New York State National Guard, also known as the Jefferson Guard) was a New York State militia, organized in 1861 in New York City, under Colonel C. Schwarzwaelder, Lieutenant Colonel Louis Burger and Major George Van Amsberg. The regiment's primary language was German.  It offered its services to the state on 16 April 1861. Although the regiment was originally organized as artillery, it was assigned to the infantry. 

The Jefferson Guards saw three months service and were mustered out on 7 August 1861. The regiment was reconstituted under Colonel Louis Burger in June 1863, and saw another month's service primarily on guard duty.

1861 service
On 20 April it was ordered to Washington, D.C., to report for federal service, and was mustered into federal service there on 1 May 1861. They were sent to Washington, D.C.,

A goodly portion of their following "three months' service was rendered, particularly at what is termed the "Relay House," where they were employed upon guard, picket and scout duty."  On 24 May 1861, the regiment took part in the occupation of Arlington Heights, Virginia, occupying Camp Union, one mile east of Ball's Crossroads. A company of the 2d New York Militia was transferred to it as Company K, on 28 May 1861. " On the 9th of July, the Fifth crossed the Potomac at Williamsport, and at the time of the battle of Bull Run was serving under General Patterson. The regiment returned to New York on the 2d of August." 

The regiment was mustered out on 7 August 1861 in New York City. Despite being no longer in existence, orders were issued on 27 May 1862 directing the regiment to proceed to Washington, D. C., for another three months service; the mistake was caught and the orders revoked the following week..  Efforts to reconstitute the regiment failed until June of 1863.

1863 service
In June 1863, in response to President Lincoln's call for volunteers, the regiment, now known as the "5th New York State National Guard", was reconstituted into federal service under now Colonel Louis Burger, and on the 18th was ordered to guard duty in Harrisburg, Pennsylvania. It was attached to Yates’ 1st Brigade, Dana’s Division,  Department of the Susquehanna.  Over the next month they served as guards in Harrisburg, Marysville, Carlisle and Chambersburg.  They did not fight at Gettysburg. 

After the Battle of Gettysburg, the regiment was mustered out of the United States service at New York city on 22 July 1863.

Notes and references

Infantry 005
1861 establishments in New York (state)
Military units and formations established in 1861
Military units and formations disestablished in 1861
Military units and formations established in 1863
Military units and formations disestablished in 1863